Karsten Tadda (born November 2, 1988) is a German professional basketball player for Telekom Baskets Bonn of the Basketball Bundesliga (BBL). He played for the German national basketball team.

Professional career
Tadda spent most of his career with Brose Baskets, and won the German League four times with Bamberg. In October 2015, during the 2015–16 season, he transferred to Gießen 46ers.

On June 14, 2016, Tadda signed with ratiopharm Ulm.

On June 17, 2021, he has signed with Telekom Baskets Bonn of the Basketball Bundesliga.

Career statistics

Euroleague

|-
| style="text-align:left;"| 2009–10
| style="text-align:left;"| Brose Baskets
| 3 || 0 || 3.0 || .500 || .000 || .000 || 1.0 || 0.3 || 0.0 || 0.0 || 0.7 || 1.0
|-
| style="text-align:left;"| 2010–11
| style="text-align:left;"| Brose Baskets
| 10 || 1 || 9.3 || .214 || .200 || .000 || 0.6 || 0.3 || 0.2 || 0.0 || 0.8 || -0.3
|-
| style="text-align:left;"| 2011–12
| style="text-align:left;"| Brose Baskets
| 10 || 0 || 8.6 || .571 || .545 || .667 || 0.7 || 0.5 || 0.3 || 0.0 || 2.4 || 2.0
|-
| style="text-align:left;"| 2012–13
| style="text-align:left;"| Brose Baskets
| 24 || 5 || 16.6 || .347 || .303 || .783 || 1.6 || 1.0 || 0.6 || 0.0 || 3.3 || 3.2
|-
| style="text-align:left;"| 2013–14
| style="text-align:left;"| Brose Baskets
| 8 || 0 || 7.1 || .333 || .250 || .1000 || 0.8 || 0.5 || 0.3 || 0.0 || 0.9 || 1.1
|- class="sortbottom"
| colspan=2  style="text-align:left;"| Career
| 55 || 6 || 11.7 || .361 || .322 || .786 || 1.1 || 0.7 || 0.4 || 0.0 || 2.2 || 1.9

References

External links
brosebaskets.de
draftexpress.com
eurobasket.com
euroleague.net
basketball.realgm.com

1988 births
Living people
Brose Bamberg players
EWE Baskets Oldenburg players
German men's basketball players
Giessen 46ers players
Sportspeople from Bamberg
Ratiopharm Ulm players
Shooting guards
Telekom Baskets Bonn players